Instinct Dance is a compilation album by Moby, collecting tracks previously released on singles under Moby's several pseudonyms. Two years later a similar compilation was released entitled Early Underground.

Track listing
 

 
[*] Only on the CD edition

References 

 

 
Moby compilation albums
1991 compilation albums
Albums produced by Moby
1991 debut albums
Instinct Records compilation albums